The South African Zionist Federation is an organisation formed in 1898, responsible for coordinating all the Zionist activities throughout the country.

It is based in Johannesburg, with additional branches in Cape Town, Durban, and Port Elizabeth.

References

Zionist organizations
Jewish organisations based in South Africa
Jewish South African history
Zionism in Africa
Civic and political organisations based in Johannesburg